Sisowath Sirik Matak (22 January 191421 April 1975) was a Cambodian politician and member of the Cambodian royal family, under the House of Sisowath.

Sirik Matak was mainly notable for his involvement in Cambodian politics, particularly for his involvement in the 1970 change in power against his cousin, then Prince Norodom Sihanouk, and for his subsequent establishment, along with Lon Nol, of the Khmer Republic.

Early life
Sirik Matak was born in Phnom Penh, and was a member of the Sisowath family, being the great-grandson of Sisowath of Cambodia by his grandfather Sisowath Essaravong and his father Sisowath Rathary. He was recruited into the colonial civil service in 1930.

Under the colonial French-imposed constitution, any member of the Norodom or Sisowath branches of the family could be selected as king, and Sirik Matak was therefore one of the possible contenders to the Cambodian throne. In 1941, after the death of King Sisowath Monivong, the French authorities selected Sirik Matak's cousin Norodom Sihanouk to be King, believing him to be relatively pliant. Sihanouk later accused Sirik Matak of harbouring a deep resentment against him, stating that he "hated me from childhood days because he thought his uncle, Prince Sisowath Monireth, should have been placed on the throne instead of myself. He even had a notion that he himself should have been chosen".

Political career

After the Second World War, Sirik Matak became increasingly involved in Cambodian politics. As a part of the right-wing Khmer Renovation party headed by Lon Nol, he took part in the National Assembly elections in 1947, though the party failed to win any seats. Sihanouk, then acting as Prime Minister, placed him in charge of defence in 1952, formally appointing him Minister of Defence in the interim government set up after independence in 1954; Sihanouk's Sangkum movement absorbed the Khmer Renovation Party prior to the Sangkum victory in the 1955 elections.

Despite the incorporation of much of the right-wing opposition into the Sangkum, Sirik Matak remained an implacable opponent of Sihanouk, and especially of the latter's toleration of North Vietnamese activity within Cambodia's borders. Throughout the 1960s, Sihanouk attempted to minimize Sirik Matak's leverage on domestic politics by successively appointing him as Ambassador to China (1962-1964), the Philippines, and Japan.

Cambodian coup of 1970

Sirik Matak's power increased substantially after Lon Nol became prime minister in August 1969. After being appointed as Lon Nol's deputy, he proceeded to organise a series of economic denationalisation and deregulation measures in opposition to Sihanouk's previous policy of state control of import and export, banking, and production of pharmaceuticals and alcohol. Sirik Matak even visited Hanoi secretly to find out what could be done to remove Vietnamese troops from Cambodian soil. He was infuriated when he was shown documents signed by Sihanouk agreeing to the establishment of Vietnamese bases and the transport of Vietnamese supplies through Cambodian ports. 

On 12 March 1970, while Sihanouk was on a trip abroad, Sirik Matak canceled Sihanouk's trade agreements and Lon Nol demanded that all North Vietnamese and NLF troops leave Cambodia by dawn on March 15. The deadline passed without any response from the Vietnamese. On 18 March, Sirik Matak assisted Lon Nol in organising a vote of the National Assembly to depose Sihanouk as head of state. The pretext was given by a series of anti-Vietnamese riots - likely encouraged by the Prime Minister and his deputy - in front of the North Vietnamese embassy.

Foreign media subsequently suggested that Sirik Matak, who continued as Lon Nol's deputy in the new government, was the real organisational force behind the coup; it was claimed that in order to finally convince Lon Nol, Sirik Matak had played him a tape-recorded press conference from Paris, in which Sihanouk threatened to execute them both on his return to Phnom Penh. It was even reported that Sirik Matak compelled Lon Nol at gunpoint to commit to deposing Sihanouk.

Sihanouk also assumed his cousin to be the main force behind the coup, claiming that Sirik Matak (backed by the CIA, and in contact with long-time Sihanouk opponent Son Ngoc Thanh) had already suggested the plan to Lon Nol as early as 1969. Sihanouk's suspicions seem to have rooted in fact: Prom Thos, one of Lon Nol's ministers, later told the historian Ben Kiernan that in around March 1969 Sirik Matak had argued that Sihanouk should be assassinated, Lon Nol rejecting the plan as "criminal insanity".

With the declaration of the Khmer Republic subsequent to the coup, Sirik Matak renounced his royal title, although he had initially planned in secret that his own son, or another member of the Sisowath family, possibly his son-in-law Prince Sisowath Duongchivin, should take the throne.

Khmer Republic
 
For the first year of the Republic, during which Lon Nol was often in poor health, Sirik Matak - as acting Premier - retained the most prominent role in the government. It had an overtly military character, Sirik Matak usually appearing in his full uniform as a Major-General and carrying a swagger stick. Whereas Lon Nol was particularly popular amongst anti-Sihanouk students in Cambodian cities, Sirik Matak had the support of the Westernised urban 'elite'; rural Cambodians remained overwhelmingly pro-Sihanouk. 

Sirik Matak also had relatively little personal support within the Cambodian political establishment; his power was gradually undermined by the Prime Minister's brother, Lon Non, and he resigned in 1972 after the latter had organised a series of demonstrations against him. Despite pressure from the United States, who were strong supporters of Sirik Matak, Lon Nol kept him under effective house arrest, and he became an increasingly vocal critic of the Khmer Republic regime.

By April 1973, Lon Nol had been compelled to remove Lon Non and suspended the National Assembly, appointing a "High Political Council" composed of himself, Sirik Matak, Cheng Heng and In Tam. Privately, however, Sirik Matak stated that under the circumstances it would be preferable to allow Sihanouk to return, due to his levels of popular support, stating "if the people wanted him, I would accept". On being informed of this, an enraged Sihanouk called Sirik Matak "one of the worst reactionaries and traitors of the history of Cambodia [...] we are going to hang him, quite simply hang him, hang him".

The fall of Phnom Penh

The Khmer Rouge communists initiated their dry-season offensive to capture the beleaguered Cambodian capital on 1 January 1975. On 1 April 1975, President Lon Nol resigned and fled the country into exile in Hawaii; the Khmer Rouge had published a 'death list' with his name at the top, and their forces had now surrounded the capital.

On 12 April 1975, United States Ambassador to Cambodia John Gunther Dean offered high officials of the Khmer Republic political asylum in the United States, but Sirik Matak, Long Boret and Lon Non, along with other members of Lon Nol's cabinet, declined - despite the names of Boret and Sirik Matak being published by the Khmer Rouge in a list of "Seven Traitors" marked for execution. Sirik Matak's written response to the ambassador stated:

The letter was reproduced and added to the book Autrefois, Maison Privée.

Shortly after the surrender to the Khmer Rouge was announced, Sirik Matak sought refuge at the Hotel Le Phnom, where the International Red Cross was attempting to create a safe zone. He was turned away once the Red Cross learned that his name was on the list of "Seven Traitors". Outside the hotel, Sirik Matak talked to reporters and distributed copies of his letter to Ambassador Dean. François Bizot reported that Sirik Matak sought political asylum at the French Embassy and that the Khmer Rouge threatened to come into the compound and remove certain individuals by force if they did not go voluntarily. Accompanied by the French Vice-Consul Jean Dyrac and journalist Jon Swain, Bizot took responsibility for informing Sirik Matak of the Khmer Rouge's demands, at which point he voluntarily surrendered and left on a Khmer Rouge Jeep with Mam Nai. Sirik Matak and the officials that remained along with him were likely executed by the Khmer Rouge on 21 April 1975.

The exact details of his death are unclear, but Sihanouk received confirmation that Sirik Matak, along with Long Boret, had been summarily executed by firing squad at the Phnom Penh Cercle Sportif on 21 April; other reports state he was beheaded. Henry Kissinger and others, however, note a report that Sirik Matak was shot in the stomach and left without medical aid to die over three days.

Quotes 
"Man is born to die. I will not move. I shall stay here and face everything that happens. They can arrest me. If they kill me, what of it? I stay for my country."

Notes

References

External links
Before the Holocaust: The Coup
The End of Cambodia: The Beginning of a Nightmare

Bibliography

 

1914 births
20th-century Cambodian politicians 
Cambodian princes
Cambodian military personnel
House of Sisowath
People of the Vietnam War
Cambodian republicans
Executed royalty
Executed politicians
Cambodian anti-communists
Defence ministers of Cambodia
1975 deaths
People executed by the Khmer Rouge
Executed Cambodian people
Government ministers of Cambodia
Ambassadors of Cambodia to China
Khmer Republic 
People who died in the Cambodian genocide